Phước Tích is a village in Thừa Thiên–Huế Province, Vietnam. Phước Tích is noted for its architectural, religious and historic value.

The village was established in 1470 and discovered in April 2003.

References
Viet Nam News - Architects seek to save historic village

1470 establishments in Asia
Populated places established in the 1470s
Populated places in Thừa Thiên Huế province
15th-century establishments in Vietnam